Blaszczak, originally Błaszczak (Polish) is a surname. Notable people with the surname include:

Mariusz Błaszczak (born 1969), Polish politician and historian
Simon Blaszczak (born 1983), Canadian football player

See also
Błaszczyk

Surnames from given names